Franz Christoph von Rothmund (28 December 1801 in Dettelbach – 30 November 1891 in Munich) was a German surgeon. He was the father of ophthalmologist August von Rothmund (1830–1906).

He studied medicine with Ignaz Döllinger (1770–1841), Cajetan von Textor (1782–1860) and Johann Lukas Schönlein (1793–1864) at the University of Würzburg, and under Karl Ferdinand von Gräfe (1787–1840) at the University of Berlin. 

From 1823, he served as court physician in Miltenberg, later performing similar duties in Volkach. In 1843 he became a professor at the University of Munich, later attaining the title of Obermedicinalrath.

Rothmund is known for his work involving "radical surgery" of hernias. He retired from medicine in 1871, and at the time of his death was considered the "doyen of German surgeons".

Written works 
 Dissertatio inauguralis de oscitatione, 1824
 Ueber Radical-Operation beweglicher  Leistenbrüche : mit 8 Kupfertafeln, 1853.

References 
 Wikisource @ Allgemeine Deutsche Biographie

Academic staff of the Ludwig Maximilian University of Munich
1801 births
1891 deaths
German surgeons
German untitled nobility
People from Kitzingen (district)